Bayulu is a large Aboriginal community located 10 km south of Fitzroy Crossing in the Kimberley region of Western Australia, within the Shire of Derby–West Kimberley. At the 2011 census, Bayulu had a population of 320.

History 

Bayulu was originally established as part of Gogo Station but was relocated to its current position in 1987.

Native title 

The community is located within the registered Gooniyandi Combined 2 (Federal Court file nos. WAD6008/2000) native title claim area.

Education 

Children of school age at Bayulu attend Bayulu Community School. The school is located on Gogo Station. It caters for 125 children from K-7, all of whom are Aboriginal. Their first language is Kriol with some Gooniyandi and Walmajarri being spoken. Australian English is the children's second language.

Governance 

The community is managed through its incorporated body, Bayulu Community Incorporated, incorporated under the Aboriginal Councils and Associations Act 1976 on 5 November 1975.

Town planning 

Bayulu Layout Plan No.1 has been prepared in accordance with State Planning Policy 3.2 Aboriginal Settlements. Layout Plan No.1 was endorsed by the community on 30 March 2011 and the Western Australian Planning Commission on 14 May 2002.

References

External links 
 National Native Title Register Details

Towns in Western Australia
Aboriginal communities in Kimberley (Western Australia)